Sara Errani and Roberta Vinci were the defending champions, but chose not participate together. Errani played alongside Flavia Pennetta, but lost in the quarterfinals to Bethanie Mattek-Sands and Lucie Šafářová. Vinci teamed up with Jelena Janković, but lost in the first round to Garbiñe Muguruza and Carla Suárez Navarro.
Mattek-Sands and Šafářová went on to win the title, defeating Caroline Garcia and Katarina Srebotnik in the final, 6–1, 6–2.

Seeds
The top four seeds received a bye into the second round.

Draw

Finals

Top half

Bottom half

References

Main Draw

Rogers Cup Doubles
Women's Doubles
Rogers